Notre-Dame-de-Bliquetuit is a commune in the Seine-Maritime department in the Normandy region in northern France.

Geography
The nearby Brotonne bridge was, until the late 20th century, the only bridge over the Seine downstream of Rouen.

The office of the Parc naturel régional des Boucles de la Seine Normande is located in Notre-Dame-de-Bliquetuit.

Population

Places of interest
 The church of Notre-Dame, dating from the eleventh century.
 The Notre-Dame manorhouse.
 A sixteenth century dovecote.
 The Maison du Parc, an ancient farmhouse.

See also
Communes of the Seine-Maritime department

References

Communes of Seine-Maritime